Byala Reka is a village in the municipality of Varbitsa, located in the Shumen Province of northeastern Bulgaria. As of 2007, the village had a population of 1167 people.

References

Villages in Shumen Province